Star Awards 2003 was an awards ceremony part of the annual Star Awards held by MediaCorp Channel 8 on 7 December 2003. The tenth installment of Star Awards were hosted by Timothy Chao for the sixth consecutive ceremony, along with current affairs hostess and nominee for the Best News and Current Affairs Presenter Chun Guek Lay.

The ceremony gave away 27 awards, six of which were awarded in the Backstage Ceremony and the rest on the main ceremony. The Backstage Ceremony does not have presenters giving out the awards. The awards which would be presented for the last time this ceremony were Malaysia's Favourite Artistes, Malaysia's Favourite Drama Serial, and Special Achievement Award, although these awards were later returned with a revised category, such as Favorite Male and Female Character, Most Popular Regional Artiste, and Social Media Award, and these awards would be awarded on a first show when the show was revamped into a two-show format between 2010 till 2016. 

The ceremony also saw an unprecedented record in the history of Star Awards for one drama serial, Holland V, which became the first drama to hold a distinction on sweeping the major award categories (winning Best Drama Serial, Best Actor/Actress, and Best Supporting Actor/Actress), and at the time the series held a record of the most number of nominations and wins, with ten and seven, respectively (the series had since broken by three other dramas, with The Little Nyonya (2009), and seasons one (2013-14) and two (2015-16) of The Dream Makers; the latter was both the current holder and the second drama serial to hold the sweeping distinction). 

Another front-runner drama, A Child's Hope, which produced its second season, would later go on to become the biggest winner in the ceremony the following year.

Winners and nominees
Winners are listed first, highlighted in boldface.

Malaysia's Favourite

Special Awards
The Special Achievement Award is an award presented annually at the Star Awards, a ceremony that was established since 1994. The award will be discontinued from the next ceremony onwards to replace the All-Time Favourite Artiste award.

The 40th Anniversary Evergreen Achievement Award, in commemoration with the 40th anniversary of the television, was awarded to an evergreen key person in the television industry.

Other awards which was also awarded in the ceremony were:

Popularity Awards

Malaysia's Favourite

Ceremony 
Professional and Technical Awards were presented before the main ceremony via a clip montage due to time constraints. The main awards were presented during the ceremony.

Performers and Presenters 
The following individuals presented awards or performed musical numbers.

Awards

References

External links
Star Awards Hall of Fame

Star Awards
2003 television awards